This page is an index for lists of some assets owned by large corporations.

Holding companies
List of assets owned by Berkshire Hathaway
List of assets owned by Bertelsmann
List of assets owned by Nestlé
List of assets owned by Procter & Gamble
List of assets owned by Shaw Communications
List of assets owned by Sony
List of assets owned by Unilever
List of assets owned by Vivendi
List of assets owned by Walmart

Supermarket companies
List of assets owned by Ahold Delhaize
List of assets owned by Albertsons
List of assets owned by Canadian Tire
List of assets owned by Hudson's Bay Company
List of assets owned by Kroger
List of assets owned by Loblaw Companies
List of assets owned by Schwarz Gruppe
List of assets owned by Wakefern Food Corporation
List of assets owned by Walmart

Media companies
Media companies are included here based on their inclusion in an online list provided by the Columbia Journalism Review, published by the Columbia University Graduate School of Journalism. The country in which the company has its corporate headquarters is noted after each company name. ( this list is incomplete.)
List of assets owned by ABS-CBN
List of assets owned by Advance Publications
List of assets owned by American Media
List of assets owned by Bell Media
List of assets owned by Belo Corporation
List of assets owned by Bertelsmann
List of assets owned by CanWest Global Communications
List of assets owned by Clear Channel Communications
List of assets owned by Comcast
List of assets owned by Corus Entertainment
List of assets owned by Dow Jones
List of assets owned by Fox Corporation
List of assets owned by Gannett
List of assets owned by Hearst Corporation
List of assets owned by Hubbard Broadcasting Corporation
List of assets owned by MGM Holdings
List of assets owned by NBCUniversal
List of assets owned by News Corp
List of assets owned by The New York Times Company
List of assets owned by Rogers Communications
List of assets owned by Sinclair Broadcast Group
List of assets owned by The Walt Disney Company
List of assets owned by Nexstar Media Group
List of assets owned by Paramount Global
List of assets owned by Village Voice Media
List of assets owned by Vivendi
List of assets owned by Warner Bros. Discovery
List of assets owned by Washington Post Company
List of assets owned by Saban Capital Group
List of assets owned by Sony

Video Game companies
List of assets owned by Activision
List of assets owned by Electronic Arts
List of assets owned by Embracer Group
List of assets owned by PlayStation Studios
List of assets owned by Take-Two Interactive
List of assets owned by Tencent
List of assets owned by Xbox Game Studios

Food & Drink companies
List of assets owned by AB InBev
List of assets owned by Bacardi
List of assets owned by Cadbury
List of assets owned by Cara Operations
List of assets owned by CKE Restaurants
List of assets owned by The Coca-Cola Company
List of assets owned by ConAgra Foods, Inc.
List of assets owned by Diageo
List of assets owned by Focus Brands
List of assets owned by The Hershey Company
List of assets owned by Hormel Foods
List of assets owned by Inspire Brands
List of assets owned by The J.M. Smucker Company
List of assets owned by Keurig Dr Pepper
List of assets owned by Kraft Heinz
List of assets owned by Mars, Incorporated
List of assets owned by Molson Coors
List of assets owned by Nabisco
List of assets owned by Nestlé
List of assets owned by PepsiCo
List of assets owned by Pernod Ricard
List of assets owned by Restaurant Brands International
List of assets owned by Yum! Brands, Inc.

Toy companies
List of assets owned by Hasbro (Games only)
List of assets owned by Hasbro (Toys only)
List of assets owned by Mattel (Games only)
List of assets owned by Mattel (Toys only)
List of assets owned by Pressman

See also
 Concentration of media ownership
Stock-taking
Hostile takeover

References

Adbusters: Who Owns What

Corporation-related lists
Corporate subsidiaries